Venema is a West Frisian patronymic surname most common in the northeast Netherlands. Notable people with the surname include:

Anneke Venema (born 1971), Dutch rower
Melissa Venema (born 1995), Dutch trumpet player
Nick Venema (born 1999), Dutch football forward
Wietse Venema (born 1951), Dutch programmer and physicist
Xander Venema (born 1985), Dutch pop singer

References

Surnames of Frisian origin
Patronymic surnames